The 1978 Australian Touring Car Championship was a CAMS sanctioned Australian motor racing title open to Group C Touring Cars. The title, which was the 19th Australian Touring Car Championship, was won by Peter Brock. It was his second Australian Touring Car Championship victory.

For the second time in the history of the championship, the point score regulation which specified that not all results counted had an effect on the championship outcome. Bob Morris finishing the series on 53 points, two less than championship winner Peter Brock, after Morris lost the two points awarded for his fifth placing at Amaroo Park. However, the regulation did not actually change the championship winner as Brock would otherwise have won the title due to the tiebreaker rule with three round wins to one for Morris. Third in the championship was the consistent Rod Stevens driving his Under 3.0 litre Ford Escort RS2000. Stevens benefited from the point system that favoured the small class cars by giving bonus points for class placings.

In his first ATCC since 1973, five time series champion Ian Geoghegan won his ninth and last ATCC race when he drove his Bob Jane owned Holden Torana to a surprise win in Round 4 at Sandown. In what would be his last ATCC season, Geoghegan finished 13th in the championship.

Calendar

The championship was contested over an eight round series.

Classes
Car competed in two engine displacement classes:
 Up to and including 3000 cc
 3001 to 6000 cc

Points system
Championship points were awarded on a 9–6–4–3–2–1 basis to the first six placegetters in each of the two classes.
Bonus points were awarded on a 4–3–2–1 basis to the first four placegetters irrespective of class.
Only the best six scores counted towards the championship totals.

Where a round was contested in two parts, points were allocated on a 20–16–13–11–10–9–8–7–6–5–4–3–2–1 basis to the first 14 place-getters in each part and then aggregated. If more than one driver attained the same total, the superior round placing was awarded to the driver who was higher placed in the last part. Championship points were then awarded for the round.

Championship standings

Note: Cars marked with an asterisk competed in the "Up to and including 3000 cc" class.

References

Australian Touring Car Championship seasons
Touring Cars